Bahram Gonbad (also Romanized as Bahrām Gonbad; also known as Bahrām Ābād) is a village in Seylatan Rural District, in the Central District of Bijar County, Kurdistan Province, Iran. At the 2006 census, its population was 108, in 29 families. The village is populated by Azerbaijanis with a Kurdish minority.

References 

Towns and villages in Bijar County
Kurdish settlements in Kurdistan Province
Azerbaijani settlements in Kurdistan Province